is a mathematical notation defined by , where  is the cosine function,  is the imaginary unit and  is the sine function. The notation is less commonly used in mathematics than Euler's formula,  which offers an even shorter notation for  but cis(x) is widely used as a name for this function in software libraries.

Overview
The  notation is a shorthand for the combination of functions on the right-hand side of Euler's formula:

where . So,

i.e. "" is an acronym for "".

The  notation was first coined by William Rowan Hamilton in Elements of Quaternions (1866) and subsequently used by Irving Stringham in works such as Uniplanar Algebra (1893), or by James Harkness and Frank Morley in their Introduction to the Theory of Analytic Functions (1898). It connects trigonometric functions with exponential functions in the complex plane via Euler's formula.

It is mostly used as a convenient shorthand notation to simplify some expressions, for example in conjunction with Fourier and Hartley transforms, or when exponential functions shouldn't be used for some reason in math education.

In information technology, the function sees dedicated support in various high-performance math libraries (such as Intel's Math Kernel Library (MKL)), available for many compilers, programming languages (including C, C++, Common Lisp, D, Fortran, Haskell, Julia, and Rust), and operating systems (including Windows, Linux, macOS and HP-UX). Depending on the platform the fused operation is about twice as fast as calling the sine and cosine functions individually.

Mathematical identities

Derivative

Integral

Other properties 
These follow directly from Euler's formula.

History 
This notation was more common when typewriters were used to convey mathematical expressions.

The  notation is sometimes used to emphasize one method of viewing and dealing with a problem over another. The mathematics of trigonometry and exponentials are related but not exactly the same; exponential notation emphasizes the whole, whereas  and  notations emphasize the parts. This can be rhetorically useful to mathematicians and engineers when discussing this function, and further serve as a mnemonic (for ).

The  notation is convenient for math students whose knowledge of trigonometry and complex numbers permit this notation, but whose conceptual understanding does not yet permit the notation .  As students learn concepts that build on prior knowledge, it is important not to force them into levels of math for which they are not yet prepared: the usual proof that  requires calculus, which the student may not have studied before encountering the expression .

See also 
 De Moivre's formula
 Euler's formula
 Complex number
 Ptolemy's theorem
 Phasor
 Versor

References 

Trigonometry
Mathematical identities